Shaahed-E-Azam is a 2002 Indian Hindi-language biographical film directed by Sukumar Nair. The film was released on 31 May 2002. The film, based upon the life of Shaheed Bhagat Singh, caused some controversy as the Punjab and Haryana High Court issued a notice to the producers calling for a ban of the movie. In the same year, two other movies on Singh were also released, named 23rd March 1931: Shaheed and The Legend of Bhagat Singh.

Bulleh Shah's song, "Tere Ishq Nachaya", is included in the film's soundtrack.

Plot 
We all know about the plot based on the Indian revolutionary Bhagat Singh.

Cast 
Sonu Sood as Bhagat Singh
Raj Zutshi as Chandra Shekhar Azad
Binnu Dhillon
Manav Vij as Sukhdev Thapar
Dev Gill as Shivram Hari Rajguru

References

External links
 

2002 films
2000s Hindi-language films
Films about Bhagat Singh
Films set in the British Raj
Films set in 1931
Hindi-language films based on actual events
Indian historical films
Indian films based on actual events
Films set in Lahore